Sir Horace Walter Cutler  (28 July 1912 – 2 March 1997) was a British Conservative politician who served as leader of the Greater London Council from 1977 to 1981. He was noted for his showmanship and flair for publicity and was, in several ways, a forerunner of Thatcherism.

Early life
Cutler was born in Stoke Newington, London, into a large but rich family. He went to Harrow County School for Boys and Hereford Cathedral School, later joining his father's building business. He spent World War II in the Royal Naval Volunteer Reserve, and after the war became a businessman.

Local politics
In 1952 he first went into politics when he was elected as a Conservative member of Harrow Borough Council, where he became Leader of the Council in 1961. He was also elected to Middlesex County Council and was its last Leader, in 1963, before it was abolished to make way for the Greater London Council.

GLC membership

Cutler took one of the Harrow seats on the GLC at its first election and remained a member of it throughout its existence, one of only eight people to do so. His prominence at Middlesex made him well-known and he served as Deputy Leader under Sir Desmond Plummer when the Conservatives were in control from 1967. Plummer gave Cutler the Chairmanship of the Housing Committee which gave him responsibility for the GLC's hundreds of thousands of units of council housing. Cutler believed that local authorities had no role in housing, and instituted a scheme to allow tenants to buy their own homes at a discounted price – which later became one of the tenets of Thatcherism. He also forcibly transferred much of the GLC housing stock to the London Boroughs. Cutler was for many years a member of the Conservative Monday Club, and wrote a booklet in 1970 entitled Rents – Chaos or Commonsense? for the club.

Leader of the GLC
When the Conservatives lost control of the GLC in 1973 and Sir Desmond Plummer resigned as their Leader in 1974, Cutler was chosen as his successor. He was a populist and a showman who delighted in stunts, and when he won the 1977 GLC elections he became a very flamboyant Leader.  He was sceptical of the merits of the GLC, seeing it as "too big, too remote and too shadowy", and set up an inquiry under Sir Frank Marshall into its powers and existence; Marshall found enough to justify the continuation of the GLC.

Cutler wanted to extend the Jubilee line into Docklands but was refused the money by the Labour Government. Investment on the London Underground was not substantial and decisions taken during his period of office have been much criticised subsequently for leading to poor infrastructure in the long term. Cutler was also noted for meddling in detailed Underground management, which London Transport Chairman Sir Peter Masefield had to persuade him to stop.  He also made a bid to host the Olympic Games of 1988, being a sports fanatic, but the national government were not supportive of this.

Horace Cutler was knighted in the 1979 Birthday Honours.

Cutler would end up being the last Conservative leader of the GLC, and the last elected leader of the party in London-wide government until Boris Johnson in 2008.

Loss of power

In the 1981 GLC elections, Cutler made a great deal of the fact that Andrew McIntosh was likely to be deposed by the much more left-wing Ken Livingstone if the Labour Party won. He concentrated on attacking Livingstone during the campaign, saying that he wished to establish a Marxist power-base in London. Nevertheless, Labour won, and McIntosh was duly voted out in favour of Livingstone. Cutler gave up the Conservative Leadership in 1982, and left politics when the GLC was abolished in 1986.

Personal life
He died in Gerrards Cross, Buckinghamshire at age 84 in 1997.

References

External links
 Extract from televised debate between Sir Horace Cutler and Ken Livingstone from 1982

1912 births
1997 deaths
20th-century English businesspeople
20th-century English politicians
Conservative Party (UK) councillors
Councillors in Greater London
English justices of the peace
Knights Bachelor
Leaders of local authorities of England
Members of the Greater London Council
Officers of the Order of the British Empire
People educated at Harrow High School
People educated at Hereford Cathedral School
People from Stoke Newington
Royal Naval Volunteer Reserve personnel of World War II
Deputy Lieutenants of Greater London